Thomas Brooke may refer to:

Politics
 Thomas Brooke (died 1418), MP for Somerset
 Thomas Brooke (died 1439), MP for Dorset and Somerset
 Thomas Brooke alias Cobham (1533–1578), MP for Rochester
 Thomas Brooke (died 1820), MP for Newton, Lancashire 1796–1807
 Col. Thomas Brooke Jr. (1660–1730), acting governor of Maryland
 Thomas Brooke, 2nd Viscount Alanbrooke (1920–1972)
 Sir Thomas Brooke, 1st Baronet (1830–1908), Director of the London and North Western Railway, Deputy Lieutenant, and Justice of the Peace
 Maj. Thomas Brooke Sr. (1632–1676), High Sheriff, Chief Justice of Calvert Co., Maryland
 Thomas Brooke (Northamptonshire MP), English member of Barebone's Parliament 1653
 Thomas Brooke, 8th Baron Cobham (died 1529), Tudor baron in England

Other
 Thomas Broke (fl. 1550), Thomas Broke or Brooke, translator
 Thomas Brooke (priest) (1684–1757), Dean of Chester 1732–1758

See also
Tom Brook (born 1953), English journalist
Thomas Brooks (disambiguation)